An Easy Girl is a 2019 French comedy-drama film directed by Rebecca Zlotowski, starring Zahia Dehar, Mina Farid, Benoît Magimel and Nuno Lopes. Set in summertime in Cannes, the film follows a 16-year-old who is drawn into her cousin's free-spirited lifestyle, despite warnings from her concerned best friend. It was screened in the Directors' Fortnight section at the 2019 Cannes Film Festival, where it won the SACD Award for Best French-language Film.

Cast
 Mina Farid as Naïma
 Zahia Dehar as Sofia
 Benoît Magimel as Philippe
 Nuno Lopes as Andrès
 Clotilde Courau as Calypso
 Loubna Abidar as Dounia
 Lakdhar Dridi as Dodo
 Henri-Noël Tabary as Stewart

Reception
The film was released on Netflix in the United States on 14 August 2020, and was the 10th most watched film on the platform in its debut weekend.

On Metacritic, the film has a weighted average score of 79 out of 100, based on reviews from 9 critics, indicating "generally favorable reviews".

References

External links
 

2019 films
2019 comedy-drama films
2010s coming-of-age comedy-drama films
2010s French-language films
2010s teen comedy-drama films
Films about cousins
Films directed by Rebecca Zlotowski
Films set in Cannes
Films shot in France
France 3 Cinéma films
French coming-of-age comedy-drama films
French teen comedy-drama films
2010s French films